The Mkwawa University College of Education (MUCE) is a constituent college of the University of Dar es Salaam in Iringa, Tanzania.
The College was established in 2005 following the upgrading of the former Mkwawa High School in response to the growing demand for teachers in the country. Since its establishment in 2005, MUCE has achieved various remarkable milestones, including the increase in students’ enrolment, number of both academic and administrative staff along with their notable development to Master's and PhD levels.  Moreover, the College has undergone massive infrastructural development and established various postgraduate programmes namely; Postgraduate Diploma in Education (PGDE) which is offered by the Faculty of Education, Master of Science with Education (M.Sc.Ed) by the Faculty of Science and Master of Arts with Education (M.A.Ed) offered by the Faculty of Humanities and Social Sciences. More efforts are under way to establish more postgraduate programmes at Master's level and their effective implementation from the academic year 2019/2020.

References

External links
 

Colleges in Tanzania
University of Dar es Salaam
Educational institutions established in 2005
2005 establishments in Tanzania